Gerald LaNoue (1912–1983) was a three-year starting quarterback for the Nebraska Cornhuskers, and earned All Big Six Conference recognition in 1935, while playing for coach Dana X. Bible.  

A native of Wisner, Nebraska, LaNoue wore jersey #11 throughout his Cornhusker career, and was considered the fastest Cornhusker running back of his era, and several historians have made comparisons between him and Husker legend Johnny Rodgers because of his speed and deceptive moves on the field.  In starring for Nebraska, LaNoue followed his cousin (and Wisner native), Lewis H. Brown (American football), who was a starting quarterback for the Cornhuskers, as well. 

Despite LaNoue's presence, the Wisner High football team had a 5-15-1 record during his playing career.  Not long after LaNoue's graduation, the school dropped football. 

LaNoue lettered twice for the Cornhuskers--in 1933 and 1935.  Due to a broken collarbone, he did not letter in 1934.

LaNoue is also linked to Nebraska football because it was through his connections that fellow Wisner native Warren Alfson became a Cornhusker football player.  Alfson ultimately earned All-America recognition in 1940.   Like Alfson, LaNoue delayed entering the University of Nebraska-Lincoln for several years, as he graduated from Wisner High in 1931, making him somewhat older than his teammates and opponents.

References

A Great Past, A Greater Future--A History of Wisner, Nebraska.  Wisner News-Chronicle; 1971.
Babcock, Mike. Go Big Red--The Ultimate Fan's Guide to Nebraska Cornhusker Football (1998). New York; St. Martin's Griffin.

1912 births
1983 deaths
LaNoue, Jerry
LaNoue, Jerry
American football quarterbacks
People from Wisner, Nebraska